Chaudhari is a surname. Notable people with the surname include:
Ankush Chaudhari (1977), Indian film actor
Bahinabai Chaudhari (1880–1951), Marathi language poet 
Manish Chaudhari (1969), Indian actor
Nirupa Chaudhari, American biologist 
Pramod Chaudhari, businessman from Maharashtra
Pratik Chaudhari (1989), Indian footballer 
Praveen Chaudhari (1937–2010), Indian American physicist
Radhika Chaudhari, Indian actress
Raghuveer Chaudhari (1938), Indian male novelist
Rahul Chaudhari (1992/1993), Indian professional Kabaddi player
Ramkumari Chaudhari (1985),  Nepali politician
Shirish Hiralal Chaudhari, Indian politician
Vivek Ram Chaudhari (1962), Indian Air Force air marshal

Hindustani-language surnames
Surnames of Hindustani origin